The 1998 Grand Prix de Tennis de Toulouse was a men's tennis tournament played on indoor hard courts in Toulouse, France that was part of the World Series of the 1998 ATP Tour. It was the seventeenth edition of the tournament and was held from 28 September until 4 October 1998. Second-seeded Jan Siemerink won the singles title.

Finals

Singles

 Jan Siemerink defeated  Greg Rusedski, 6–4, 6–4

Doubles

 Olivier Delaître /  Fabrice Santoro defeated  Paul Haarhuis /  Jan Siemerink, 6–2, 6–4

References

External links
 ITF tournament edition details

Grand Prix de Tennis de Toulouse
Grand Prix de Tennis de Toulouse
Grand Prix de Tennis de Toulouse
Grand Prix de Tennis de Toulouse
Grand Prix de Tennis de Toulouse